Bernard Blanchet (born 1 December 1943 in Saint-Mars-la-Jaille) is a former professional French football player.

External links
 
 
Profile on FFF.fr 
Profile on Free.fr 

1943 births
Living people
French footballers
France international footballers
FC Nantes players
Stade Lavallois players
Ligue 1 players
Association football forwards
Footballers from Loire-Atlantique